Perversion is a 1998 album by industrial rock band Gravity Kills. It was released on June 9, 1998 through TVT Records.

Background
During an online chat session on April 17, 2000, the band disclosed that the title of the album was originally going to be 'Whore', and after their record label pushed back, the title was changed to 'Perversion' two days before the CDs went into production. They also stated that the actual title of the tenth track, 'Belief', is simply the word itself, and the '(To Rust)' was the result of a misprint during the cover art's production process. The album art features a scan of an instructions sheet on safe handling of meat and poultry. The inner sleeve features a double-spread image of the band in a room occupied by pigs; vocalist Jeff Scheel is tied to a chair while rapidly shaking his head, while the other band members are stood next to a table with headphones on. A red neon sign is affixed to the wall behind them, displaying seemingly nonsensical white Japanese text.

The original release date for the album was June 6th 1998, before it was later pushed back to September 6th of the same year.

Promotion
A promotional CD was released under the same name in early 1998, containing all of the album's tracks. "Drown" was retitled as "Drowned" or "Drowning" depending on the pressing. After being approached by TVT Records, American cosmetics brand Urban Decay released a nail polish as a promotional tie-in product for the album. The polish, titled 'Perversion', was a glossy black color and was given away for free with each copy of the album bought from various outlets. Vocalist Jeff Scheel said of the collaboration, "I think it fits in with most rock bands because there's this marriage between rock music and fashion anyway. And guys wear [nail polish]. Anyway, I will be wearing it." The color became a staple until Urban Decay discontinued their nail range.

Reception
Perversion was met with mixed reviews and ratings. Allmusic gave the album 2.5/5, eMusic gave it a 4/5 and MOG gave it 3/5. It reached #107 on the Billboard 200. Reviewing the album for Spin, Joshua Westlund commented that the band was recreating Nine Inch Nails's song "Head Like a Hole" and stated, "Gravity Kills songs have no subjects because pronouns don't matter to singer Jeff Scheel; the charges against "you" in the first verse always come back as revelations about "me" in the second. Lust, disgust, and ennui sound like the same numb sensation in GK's music. Which might explain why "darkness" has seldom sounded so gray."

Chart positions

Album

Singles

Complication-promo appearances 
Some of the songs appeared in some complication volumes and promos:

Media appearances
"Drown" and "Alive" were featured in Test Drive: Off-Road 2. "Falling" was featured in Test Drive 5. "If" was featured in MTV Sports: Pure Ride.

Track listing

Personnel
Gravity Kills
 Jeff Scheel - Lead vocals
 Matt Dudenhoeffer - Guitar
 Doug Firley - Keyboard and Bass
 Kurt Kerns - Drums and Bass

Production
 Produced by Roli Mosimann and Gravity Kills
 Engineered by Doug Firley and Federico Panero
 Mixed by Gary Townsley and East Side Sound
 Written by Gravity Kills
 Photos by Joseph Cultice
 Package Design by David Lau

References

TVT Records albums
Gravity Kills albums
1998 albums